Kenzi may refer to:

 Abdelhani Kenzi, an Algerian boxer
 The Kenzi language, a Nubian language spoken in southern Egypt
 Mackenzie "Kenzi" Malikov, a character in the 2010s TV series Lost Girl